The Embassy of the Republic of Korea in Moscow is the chief diplomatic mission of South Korea in the Russian Federation. It is located at 56 Plyushchikha Street in the Khamovniki District of Moscow.

See also 
 Russia–South Korea relations
 Diplomatic missions in Russia

References

External links 
  Embassy of South Korea in Moscow

Russia–South Korea relations
Korea, South
Moscow
Khamovniki District